The 1990 United States Senate election in Wyoming was held November 6, 1990. Incumbent Republican U.S. Senator Alan K. Simpson was elected to a third term in office.

Democratic primary

Candidates
 Dale Bulman
 Al Hamburg
 Kathy Helling, college student
 Don C. Joliffe
 Emmett Jones
 Howard O'Connor, perennial candidate from Torrington

Results

Republican primary

Candidates
 Douglas W. Crook
 Nora M. Lewis, candidate for Senate in 1988
 Alan K. Simpson, incumbent Senator

Results

General election

Results

See also 
 1990 United States Senate elections

References

External links 
 General election debate at American Archive of Public Broadcasting

1990
Wyoming
United States Senate